Fernances is a suburb of Sydney, within the Hawkesbury electorate of the state of New South Wales, Australia.

References

Suburbs of Sydney
City of Hawkesbury